HFF may refer to:

Film festivals 
 Hamilton Film Festival, in Ontario, Canada
 Heartland Film Festival, in Indianapolis, Indiana, United States

Sport 
 Hallands Fotbollförbund, a Swedish football association
 Haparanda FF, a Swedish football club
 Hellenic Football Federation, in Greece
 Hocasan Football Federation, in Azerbaijan

Other uses 
 HFF (commercial real estate), a defunct American commercial real estate broker
 Housing Financing Fund, Island's government mortgage lender
 Human: Fall Flat, a puzzle-platform video game
 University of Television and Film Munich
 Hebi East railway station, China Railway telegraph code HFF